The Eastern Lancaster County School District ("Elanco") is a school district in Lancaster County, Pennsylvania. It is a member of Lancaster–Lebanon Intermediate Unit (IU) 13.

Schools

 Brecknock Elementary School – Denver, Pennsylvania
 Blue Ball Elementary School – Blue Ball, Pennsylvania
 New Holland Elementary School – New Holland, Pennsylvania
 Garden Spot Middle School – New Holland, Pennsylvania
 Garden Spot Senior High School – New Holland, Pennsylvania
Caernarvon Elementary - Closed in 2008 - Demolished in 2009
The old New Holland Elementary School has conjoined with Summit Valley, which been renamed New Holland Elementary.
The old New Holland Elementary building has been cleared.

References

External links
 Official website

School districts in Lancaster County, Pennsylvania